Lebenswogen is a 1917 Austro-Hungarian silent film directed by Jacob Fleck and Luise Fleck and starring Wilhelm Klitsch, Liane Haid and Hermann Benke.  The term "lebenswogen" translates to "life waves".

Cast
 Wilhelm Klitsch as Dr. Erwin Lenk 
 Liane Haid as Bergers Tochter 
 Hermann Benke as Kommerzialrat Berger 
 Moritz Millmann as Prof. Dr. Wanderberg
 Friedrich Feher 
 Else Kündinger 
 Eduard Sekler

Production
Lebenswogen was filmed in Vienna in 1916, and was  subsequently banned for youth in Germany.  The movie premiered in Vienna on January 5, 1917.

References

Bibliography
 Parish, Robert. Film Actors Guide. Scarecrow Press, 1977.

External links

Austro-Hungarian films
1917 films
Austrian silent feature films
Films directed by Jacob Fleck
Films directed by Luise Fleck
Austrian black-and-white films